Kenneth Fiddling (13 October 1917 – 19 June 1992) was a first-class cricketer whose career spanned the 1938 to 1953 seasons.

Born in Hebden Bridge, Yorkshire, England, Fiddling was a professional who played 18 games for Yorkshire from 1938 to 1946, and 142 for Northants from 1947 to 1953. A specialist wicket-keeper, he took 226 catches and completed 76 stumpings in 160 matches.  He was less prolific as a right-handed batsman, scoring 1,380 runs at 11.69, with a best score of 68 for Northants against Surrey. His career was finished by ill health.

Fiddling died in Halifax, West Yorkshire, in June 1992.

References

1917 births
1992 deaths
People from Hebden Bridge
Yorkshire cricketers
Northamptonshire cricketers
English cricketers
Sportspeople from Yorkshire
Wicket-keepers